Abby Norman may refer to:

 Abby Norman (beauty pageant titleholder), Miss Wyoming USA
 Abby Norman (writer), American science writer